Culturally modified tree (aka CMT) is a tree modified by indigenous people as part of their tradition. Such trees are important sources for the history of certain regions. 

The term is used in western Canada and the United States. In British Columbia, one of the most commonly modified trees, particularly on the coast, is the Western Red Cedar. The Sami people of northern Scandinavia and indigenous people of southeast Australia modify trees. Basque herders left thousands of trees in the western United States between 1860 and 1930.

Regions

Australia
The role of cedars, spruces etc. are taken over by much different species in Australia. Here the red (river) gum (Eucalyptus camaldulensis) and the grey box (Eucalyptus moluccana) are of most importance. There are certain similarities as far as the usage is concerned. Rhoads published in 1992 that within the territory of Southwest Victoria (about 10,000 km²) 228 CMTs were found in the vicinity of ancient camps.

Canada 
In British Columbia, Canada, these trees are protected by complex laws. Trees dating before 1846 and registered as CMTs are not allowed to be logged. The first lawsuit concerning CMTs was against a Canadian who had logged CMTs over 300 years old. The oldest living CMT was found in British Columbia. It dates back to the 12th century.).

In Canada, where research was for obvious reasons concentrated in the western provinces with its old forests, Ontario documented CMTs in 2001. In Nagagamisis Provincial Park most trees found were between 80 and 110 years old, some probably more than 400.

On Hanson Island alone, David Garrick documented 1800 CMTs. The Kwakwaka'wakw of the region could stop the destruction of their archive. Garrick also found trees in the Great Bear Rainforest on the territory of the Gitga'at First Nation. They are supposed to be logged for a street in the area of Langford. In February 2008, the Times Colonist reported of protesters being removed.

No license was given between 1996 and 2006, but in that year it was allowed once again - against the resistance of the Haida on Haida Gwaii. Even if loggers accept the restrictions and spare a CMT, these trees are endangered because they lose their "neighbours" and with them the protection against heavy storms. Consequently, Hupacasath First Nation on the western shore of Vancouver Island claims a protective zone around the trees of at least 20 to 30 metres.

The trees are a source of utmost importance for the history of the First Nations, a history that is heavily dependent on oral traditions and archaeological findings for the pre-contact phase.

This causes many problems for historians, ethnohistorians, anthropologists. The logging industry has reduced the old forests to a minimum in most regions and thus destroyed the culturally modified trees.

Another problem is that knowledge of these places is not necessarily public. That is the case with many Nuu-chah-nulth on Vancouver Island. Only that group knows the corresponding rituals, devices, stories and dances, so their consent is needed.

The tiny Island of Flores is home to 71 registered culturally modified trees which are protected like archives, libraries, historic sites or memorials.

After historians and the courts had recognized that the trees of Meares Island are crucial for the culture and history of the Indian Nation living there, other indigenous groups started to register CMTs in their own reserves and in their traditional territories to get the same protection for them. Historians and Indians worked closely together.

Gottesfeld could detect 21 species, which played a certain role as CMTs. Of utmost importance is the Western red cedar (Thuja plicata), but the yellow cedar (Chamaecyparis nootkatensis), spruces (Picea glauca u.a.), hemlock (Tsuga heterophylla), pines (Pinus contorta, Pinus ponderosa), in addition Populus tremuloides, Populus trichocarpa and Alnus rubra are also quite frequent. The bark of hemlock and certain spruces was important for nourishment and medicine. The resin of spruces was used as a kind of glue.

Scandinavia

CMTs have become important for the history of Scandinavia, too. The Sami people, who also ate certain kinds of bark, were displaced northwards in the 19th century by the Swedish population, who did not eat bark. Consequently, the traces of bark peelers are interrupted from one year to the next, so that historians can exactly tell when the last Sami left the region under examination. The oldest finding ever registered is 2800 years old. Meanwhile, the methods are so much refined that even fossile trees have become an important source for human history.

United States
The most surprising fact was a consequence of research within the Bob Marshall Wilderness in northwestern Montana. This is a wilderness of about 3,000 km² (in addition another 3000 of neighbouring wildernesses) that was never used by non-aboriginal people. There are no houses, streets, fields or pastures. Nevertheless, the CMTs showed that between at least 1665 and 1938 indigenous people peeled the bark and conducted other uses.

In 1985 a protection program was started in Washington's Gifford Pinchot National Forest. At 338 spots, more than 6000 CMTs were identified, of which 3000 are protected now.

Seventeen CMTs were found in the Blue Mountain area within Pike National Forest, at least 26 in Florissant Fossil Beds National Monument. Trees more than 200 years old were registered in Manitou Experimental Forest north of Woodland Park. Most of these trees within the territory of the Ute are ponderosa pines. Ute elders have differing opinions as to whether CMTs are a tradition. Researchers know that they haven't got that much time. The trees have a life expectancy of 300 to 600 years. Many could be dated, being peeled between 1816 and 1848. In February 2008, the Colorado Historical Society decided to invest a part of its 7 million dollar budget into a CMT project in Mesa Verde National Park. The Bureau of Land Management provides this form form the documentation of CMTs, in conjunction with History Colorado's Office of Archaeology & Historic Preservation.

References

Reading 
 R. Andersson, Historical Land-Use Information from Culturally Modified Trees, Diss. Swedish University of Agricultural Sciences, Umea 2005
 M. Antrop, Why landscapes of the past are important for the future. Landscape and urban planning 70 (2005) 21-34
 Arcas Associates, Native Tree Use on Meares Island, B.C., 4 volumes, Victoria 1986
 I. Bergman/L. Östlund/O. Zackrisson, The use of plants as regular food in ancient subarctic economies. A case study based on Sami use of Scots pine innerbark. Arctic anthropology 41 (2004) 1-13
 M. D. Blackstock, Faces in the forest: First Nations art created on living trees. Montreal/Kingston: McGill-Queen's University Press 2001, 224 pp.
 G. Carver, An Examination of Indigenous Australian Culturally Modified Trees in South Australia. Doctoral thesis. Department of Archaeology, Flinders University, Australia 2001
 Juliet Craig: "Nature was the provider". Traditional ecological knowledge and inventory of culturally significant plants and habitats in the Atleo River Watershed, Ahousaht Territory, Clayoquot Sound, PHD. Victoria 1998
 V. V. Eetvelde//M. Antrop, Analyzing structural and functional changes of traditional landscapes: two examples from Southern France. Landscape and urban planning 67 (2004) 79-95
 T. S. Ericsson, Culture within nature: Key areas for interpreting forest history in boreal Sweden (Acta Universitatis Agriculturae Sueciae), 2001
 David Garrick, Shaped Cedars and Cedar Shaping:  A Guidebook to Identifying, Documenting, Appreciating and Learning from Culturally Modified Trees.  Special Limited Edition, Western Canada Wilderness Committee, 1998.
 L. M. J. Gottesfeld, The importance of bark products in the aboriginal economies of northwestern British Columbia, Canada. Economic botany 46 (1992) 148-157
 R. J. Hebda/R. W. Mathewes, Holocene history of Cedar and Native Indian cultures of the North American Pacific coast. Science 225 (1984) 711-713
 L. M. Johnson, "A place that’s good". Gitksan landscape perception and ethnoecology. Human ecology 28 (2000) 301-325
 J. Mallea-Olaetxe, Speaking through the aspens: Basque tree carvings in California and Nevada. University of Nevada Press, Reno / Las Vegas 2000, 237 pp.
 Amanda L. Marshall, Culturally modified trees of the Nechako plateau: cambium utilization amongst traditional carrier (Dahkel) peoples. Master's thesis. Department of Archaeology, Simon Fraser University 2002
 C. Mobley, The Ship Island site: Tree-ring dating the last battle between the Stikine Tlingit and the Tsimshian. A report to the Alaska Humanities Forum, Grant 1999, 36-96
 C.M. Mobley and M. Eldridge, Culturally Modified Trees in the Pacific Northwest. Arctic Anthropology. 29 (1992) 91-110.
 J. Oliver, Beyond the Water's Edge: Towards a Social Archaeology of Landscape on the Northwest Coast. Canadian Journal of Archaeology 31 (2007) 1-27.
 B. Pegg, Dendrochronology, CMTs, and Nuu-chah-nulth History on the West Coast of Vancouver Island. Canadian Journal of Archaeology 24 (2000) 77–88.
 P. Prince, Dating and Interpreting Pine Cambium collection Scars from Two Parts of the Nechako River Drainage, British Columbia. Journal of Archaeological Science 28 (2001) 253–263.
 Sheila D. Ready, Peeled Trees on the Payette National Forest, Inner Bark Utilization as a Food Resource by Native Americans, USDA Payette National Forest, Supervisor's Office, McCall, Idaho 1993
 J. W. Rhoads, Significant sites and non-site archaeology: a case-study from south- east Australia. World archaeology 24 (1992) 199-217
 Arnoud H. Stryd/Vicki Feddema, Sacred Cedar. The Cultural and Archaeological Significance of Culturally Modified Trees, digital (PDF, 1,3 MB): Stryd/Feddema
 A.H. Stryd and M. Eldridge, CMT Archaeology in British Columbia: The Mears Island Studies. BC Studies 99 (1993) 184–234.
 T. W. Swetnam, Peeled ponderosa pine trees: A record of inner bark utilization by Native Americans. Journal of ethnobiology 4 (1984) 177-190

External links 

 Millennia Research
 British Columbia Ministry of Forest - CMT Handbook
 Chris Hudson, Culturally Modified Trees, in: WaveLength Magazine, March 2003
 Lars Ostlund, Olle Zackrisson, GregerHornberg, Trees on the border between nature and culture: Culturally modified trees in boreal Sweden, January 2002
 Sheepherders of Northern Nevada. A Multimedia Exhibit - Arborglyphs - arboglyphs of Basque herders
 A video from El Paso County, Colorado, describing Culturally Modified Trees in Fox Run Regional Park, April 2018

Trees
Ethnobotany